Heliobolus is a genus of lizards of the family Lacertidae. The genus is endemic to Africa.

Species
There are six recognized species:
Heliobolus bivari  – Bivar’s bushveld lizard
Heliobolus crawfordi  – Crawford-Cabral’s bushveld lizard
Heliobolus lugubris  – bushveld lizard, mourning racerunner, black and yellow sand lizard
Heliobolus neumanni  – Neumann's sand lizard
Heliobolus nitidus  – glittering sand lizard
Heliobolus spekii  – Speke's sand lizard

Nota bene: A binomial authority in parentheses indicates that the species was originally described in a genus other than Heliobolus.

References

Further reading
Branch, Bill (2004). Field Guide to Snakes and other Reptiles of Southern Africa. Third Revised edition, Second impression. Sanibel Island, Florida: Ralph Curtis Books. 399 pp. . (Genus Heliobolus, p. 161).
Fitzinger L (1843). Systema Reptilium, Fasciculus Primus, Amblyglossae. Vienna: Braumüller & Seidel. 106 pp. + indices. (Heliobolus, new genus, p. 20). (in Latin).

 
Lizard genera
Lacertid lizards of Africa
Taxa named by Leopold Fitzinger